Noatun or Nóatún may refer to:

 Nóatún (mythology), a place in Norse mythology
 , a chain of Icelandic supermarkets
 Nóatún (street), Reykjavík